Aedes koreicus is a mosquito species originally described from Korea that has been shown to be enzootic to Japan, northeastern China, the Republic of Korea (South Korea), parts of Russia, but recently found in Belgium, Italy, Germany, Hungary, Slovenia, Switzerland  and Kazakhstan.  Adult Aedes koreicus are relatively large, with areas of white scales on black background, strongly resembling Aedes japonicus, which has also become established outside its native range.


Bionomics

Aedes koreicus larvae have been found breeding in artificial water collection sites such as garden ponds, water drums, manholes, buckets, flower pots, discarded tires, and other water-containing vessels, as well as in natural collection sites such as tree holes, stone cavities, road tracks, and ditches, in either clear or organics-rich water. These characteristics adapt it to surviving transport over long distances and exploiting urban as well as periurban habitats.

The first documentation of Aedes koreicus becoming established outside its native range was in Belgium in 2008, marking it as an invasive species capable of being globally transported.  In 2011 it was discovered to be established in the Province of Belluno, Veneto region, Italy and in 2013 in the Swiss-Italian border region. Given its demonstrated ability to survive northern European winters and benefit from human-aided transport, the species may be introduced and become established in other temperate countries with similar climates to those where it has already become established.

Medical importance
Aedes koreicus adults feed on humans, domestic animals, and farm animals during day and night hours  and have been demonstrated to be competent vectors of Japanese encephalitis virus and dog heartworm, and a potential vector of other arboviruses, and Brugia malayi, which causes lymphatic filariasis.

References

koreicus
Insects described in 1917
Insect vectors of human pathogens